The Monster Ball Tour was the second worldwide concert tour by American singer Lady Gaga. Staged in support of her first EP, The Fame Monster (2009) and comprising a set list of songs from that and her debut studio album, The Fame (2008), the tour visited arenas and stadiums from 2009 through 2011. It is the highest grossing tour for a debut headlining artist in history. Described as "the first-ever pop electro opera" by Gaga, the tour was announced in October 2009 after an intended joint concert tour with rapper Kanye West was suddenly cancelled. The Monster Ball Tour commenced four days after the release of The Fame Monster in November 2009.

A revision of the tour occurred after only a few months of performances, due to Gaga's concern that the original version was constructed within a very short span of time. The stage of the original show looked like a frame, comparable to that of a hollowed-out television set. Since The Fame Monster dealt with the paranoias Gaga had faced, the main theme of the original shows became human evolution, while elements of the cancelled tour with West were still included in some parts. From 2010 onwards, the revamped shows had a New York theme and portrayed a story set in the city, where Gaga and her friends got lost and had to find their way to "the Monster Ball". Both versions of the show were divided into five segments, with the last being the encore. Each of them featured Gaga in new outfits, singing songs related to the concept of the segment, as they were followed by a video interlude.

The tour received positive reviews, with critics praising Gaga's singing abilities and the theatricality of the show. The Monster Ball was a commercial success, with extra demand for tickets prompting organisers to add multiple dates to the itinerary. It ultimately grossed an estimated US$227.4 million from 200 reported shows, attended by an audience of 2.5 million. At the 2010 Billboard Touring Awards, Gaga won the Breakthrough Performer Award, as well as the Concert Marketing & Promotion Award. HBO filmed a special of The Monster Ball Tour during Gaga's February 2011 shows at Madison Square Garden in New York City. Documenting the whole concert with intersperses of backstage footage, Lady Gaga Presents the Monster Ball Tour: At Madison Square Garden, aired in May and was released on DVD and Blu-ray on November 21, 2011.

Background 
Initially, rapper Kanye West and Lady Gaga had plans to launch a joint tour in October 2009, known as Fame Kills: Starring Kanye West and Lady Gaga. Amid negative response to his controversial outbursts at the 2009 MTV Video Music Awards, West declared that he would take a hiatus from his music career. Nevertheless, the complete schedule for Fame Kills was released, with the tour set to begin on November 10, 2009, in Phoenix, Arizona. Shortly afterwards, the tour was officially cancelled without any explanation. Gaga addressed the situation at Billboards annual Women in Music luncheon, where she cited creative differences as the reason for the tour's cancellation. In an interview she stated, "[Kanye] is going to take a break, but the good news is, I am not."

After assuring the public that she would be embarking on her own tour, Gaga officially announced the Monster Ball Tour on October 15, 2009. It was originally planned to debut in London in early 2010, but ended up kicking off on November 27, 2009, in Montreal. Rapper Kid Cudi and singer Jason Derulo were confirmed as the supporting acts for the tour, with Cudi supporting Gaga from the beginning of the tour, and Derulo joining from December 28, 2009. The official poster for the tour featured Gaga in Versace 676 sunglasses and wearing a gyroscope around her called "The Orbit", which she first wore on the October 3, 2009, episode of Saturday Night Live. The contraption was designed by Nasir Mazhar in collaboration with Gaga's own creative production company, Haus of Gaga. The tour's sponsor of the American leg was Virgin Mobile USA, who introduced the "Free I.P." program which offered free show tickets to fans who volunteered their time to homeless youth organizations.

Development

Original concept 

In an interview with Rolling Stone, Gaga explained that she wanted to put together an expensive looking, beautiful show which would be affordable for her fans. She asserted that the tour was a "pop-electro opera" because the theatrics and story elements interwoven within it played out like an opera. According to her, the design of the show was innovative and forward in terms of creativeness. Gaga wanted to change the shape of the stage and designed one with Haus of Gaga that was "essentially a frame with forced perspective, and the frame is put inside the stage." The stage had a triangular inset, like a diamond, and everywhere the show took place, the dimensions were measured in such a way that the box fit any stage. "So no matter where I go, my fans get the same experience. So often you go into theaters and there's ambient light flying in from all sorts of places, and the audience is in different spots, and the stage is in different shapes and lengths and widths and depths, so this is a way for me to control all the light and all of the different elements of the show", she added.

The show revolved around themes of evolution, as well as her paranoias represented on The Fame Monster. While developing the tour Gaga spoke about original sin and demons inside human beings; "So we talked about growth, and that led us into this kind of scientific space, and we started talking about evolution and the evolution of humanity and how we begin as one thing, and we become another." This theme of monsters and evolution played a part in the fashion for the tour, which according to Gaga was "another level from where we were with the Fame Ball. [...] It's going to be a truly artistic experience that is going to take the form of the greatest post-apocalyptic house party that you've ever been to." Although Gaga stated that she was inspired by the things she and West were doing with the Fame Kills tour, she concluded that she did not want to use any of the things that they had designed together. Later, she said that Fame Kills was "the great lost tour", but confirmed that some of the elements of it were incorporated into The Monster Ball.

In an interview with MTV News, Gaga further described the tour:
"I begin as a cell and I grow and change throughout the show. And it's also done in what now is becoming my aesthetic, which is, you know, it's part pop, part performance art, part fashion installation—so all of those things are present... It's a story, it's me battling all my monsters along the way. I'm playing all the music from The Fame, all the music from The Fame Monster. And the stage that I designed with the Haus [of Gaga] is a giant cube that sits. Imagine you were to hollow out a TV and just break the fourth wall on a TV screen. It forces you to look at the center of the TV. It's my way of saying, 'My music is art.'"

For the performance of "Paparazzi", Gaga had collaborated with her Haus of Gaga creative partner Matthew "Matty Dada" Williams. She had a different vision for it in the beginning. Dada thought that Gaga should wear her hair braided, which Gaga had never done before. Dada's explanation for the concept was the look of Rapunzel, the fairy-tale character. He felt that "it's something people deeply understand. And when you're wearing sunglasses on a scaffolding piece with a giant alien dancing behind you, I promised [to Gaga] it's not going to look like Rapunzel.'"

Revamped concept 

In December 2009, Gaga revealed that she planned to cancel the concept of the original shows of The Monster Ball Tour and start afresh. She felt that the revamp of the show was needed as the original tour was constructed in a very short span of time. Gaga recalled that after West and she split up for this tour, she was unsure if she could get a show together in time, but nevertheless wanted to promote The Fame Monster. Hence she was able to put together "something that, in truth, I never would have done if I had a longer amount of time". The revamp of the tour was planned from the arena shows in the United Kingdom from February 2010. "My team thinks I'm completely psychotic. But I don't fucking care what they think. [...] Well, just to give you an idea, the stage is about four times the size of the one we're on now and conceptually, it's completely different. One thing that has been lost over the past 10-15 years, in pop music, is the idea of showbiz. And this is definitely going to bring that back", clarified Gaga. According to James Montgomery of MTV, the show recalled the Broadway performance musicals The Wizard of Oz (1939) and West Side Story (1961), the Broadway stage musical Metropolis (1989), and the television mini-series Angels in America (2003).

During an interview with London's 95.8 Capital FM radio station, Gaga further elaborated on the changes in the show. She said that the show was constructed like a piece of musical theater. It also incorporated a number of contemporary and old musical pieces, some of them being re-recorded specifically for the show itself. A new keytar was constructed for the show and was named Emma. The instrument was created by the Haus of Gaga and the singer said, "We have this new instrument that I brought to the Brits tonight, 'Emma', which is what I was playing on the stage. She's a hybrid from all these other instruments." During an interview on KISS-FM with Ryan Seacrest, on his show On Air with Ryan Seacrest, Gaga explained that the concert tour was still called The Monster Ball, but it had become more of a musical and less of a concert. It had a New York theme at its core; telling a story where Gaga and her friends travel to The Monster Ball, but get lost.

Concert synopsis

Pre-revisions 

Beginning behind a giant, green, laser lit video screen featuring scrim lights, Gaga appeared in a bulb-covered futuristic silver jeweled jumpsuit with matching eye makeup and mask and sang "Dance in the Dark" as dancers, dressed in white balaclavas and white jumpsuits, moved around her. The video screen, resembling an electric mathematical grid, was eventually lifted during the performance. After the song, Gaga strapped a portable silver jeweled keyboard to herself and began to perform "Just Dance" while emerging from the inside of a white cube on a platform. This was followed by a brief video intermission and Gaga returned onstage in an off-white costume, that resembled an alien ecto-skeleton, while the dancers wore skeletal headgear. She started performing "LoveGame", which ended with Gaga pointing towards her groin. Flames appeared on the video screens, as she got out of her ecto-skeleton outfit. After stripping down to a silver bodysuit she performed "Alejandro", and was carried by her  crotch by one of her male dancers, and later lowered onto another one of them.

The section was followed by a video interlude featuring snarling dogs and brooding ravens. The performance of "Monster" began with Gaga emerging in a black feathered jacket and performing dance moves reminiscent of Michael Jackson as the backdrops featured a black bird's wings. She continued with two songs from The Fame Monster titled "So Happy I Could Die" and "Teeth", after which she removed the feathered dress. Gaga then started performing the song "Speechless" on piano, and continued with an acoustic version of "Poker Face". Rapper Kid Cudi joined her then to perform his song "Make Her Say" which contains a sample of "Poker Face". This segment was followed by the performance of "Fashion" and "The Fame", during which Gaga wore a gold Egyptian styled crown and matching body suit, compared to the garment of a viking. Gaga crawled atop her piano during the follow-up songs "The Fame" and "Money Honey", after which she returned to the stage, dressed in black vinyl and nearly nude in a red patent leather bikini, to perform "Boys Boys Boys", backed by a squadron of skinny and shirtless leather boys. During "Poker Face", she wore a bondage inspired black leather dress with guns hanging from it and a hat made of muzzles, and pumped her hands in the air while performing the song. This was followed by Gaga sitting on a dentist's chair and spreading her legs during "Paper Gangsta". Another video interlude followed, displaying arty poses of Gaga in gothic looks.

She returned to the stage while wearing  multiple donned braided extensions for "Paparazzi". Gaga was perched atop a railing and from each of her braids, a dancer was attached on the stage. A backdrop of stars were shown during the performance. The performance ended with the railing taking Gaga high above the stage, where she faked her death. This was followed by "Eh, Eh (Nothing Else I Can Say)" as she descended from the top—which signified her rebirth—amidst white lights and mechanical fog. She wore a giant gyroscope around her, akin to "The Orbit" by Haus of Gaga. The last song of the show was "Bad Romance" which she performed in an '80s-inspired white power suit with exaggerated high shoulders and high-waisted pants. The show ended with a video of Gaga getting a heart-shaped tattoo on her shoulder, with the word "Dad" in the center of it.

Post-revisions 

After revisions, the show was divided into four sections: City, Subway, Forest, Monster Ball and concluded with an encore. It began with a projected video onto a curtain—which contained images of Gaga doing a 360 degree jump—while a club remix of "Dance in the Dark" played. Surrounded by violet light, her silhouette appeared on the curtain while she performed "Dance in the Dark". Once the curtain was removed and the chorus reached, the New York cityscape and neon lights were revealed. Gaga gyrated on the set dressed in a "futuristic, angular, glitter ball suit". After descending from her fire escape, she poked around in the hood of a dilapidated green Rolls-Royce while performing "Glitter and Grease". Upon checking under the vehicle's bonnet, Gaga revealed a keyboard and began to play the opening notes of "Just Dance". Gaga then performed "Beautiful, Dirty, Rich" while scaling various pieces of scaffolding and subsequently "The Fame" where she rose from beneath the stage and played her keytar Emma, wearing a giant red cape.

"LoveGame" saw the beginning of the Subway section, with Gaga wearing a translucent nun's habit, and a skeletal hand. The song was performed with the aid of a gilded subway car and a "disco stick" while her next number "Boys Boys Boys" featured muscly male dancers cavorting in spandex shorts. After a costume change, Gaga burst into "Money Honey" with an extended keytar solo after emerging from beneath the stage as the New York scenery disappeared around her. As she walked towards the Glitter way, Gaga recalls when she was in jail and her friend Beyoncé bailed her out, thus performing the song "Telephone". A piano is then brought in and Gaga goes into the song "Brown Eyes", after which she performs "Speechless" while the piano starts spitting fire. This segment also saw the performance of "You and I" in some of the shows; the song was later added to Gaga's second studio album, Born This Way. During this song, she tells the audience about her life as a teen in New York, and how she became who she is today. Gaga and her friends then continue down the Glitter Way, and soon they run into an angel, who plays an angelic tune that summons a twister, taking them closer to the Monster Ball, but landing them in a strange place that they did not know. Gaga sings "So Happy I Could Die", decked in a white dress, that moves on its own accord.

The third segment begins with Gaga returning on the stage and singing "Monster", inside a forest with black, thorn-like trees. Her dancers conglomerate around her near the end and Gaga reveals herself to be covered with blood. She then states that the thing she hates more than money is the truth and performs "Teeth", while introducing her band. Gaga and her friends then find the Eternal Fountain, which pours out red colored liquid and Gaga explains that it bleeds for anyone. She starts singing "Alejandro" while jumping into the fountain and singing, as blood pours over her. Gaga then returns and sings "Poker Face" on the cat-walk. After the performance, she and her friends find themselves in a dark place, and after some dialogue, Gaga's friends run off, leaving her alone to deal with the Fame Monster, a giant angler fish. Gaga starts singing "Paparazzi" and eventually kills the Fame Monster by shooting sparks from her pyrotechnic bra and underwear. She then leaves for the Monster Ball and after appearing there, meanwhile fans assume the show is not over yet, suddenly Gaga appears on stage and  performs the song, "Bad Romance" while standing inside a giant gyroscope. After the song, she says that she can do one more song for an encore to the audience. Born This Way is performed with Gaga singing with a hand microphone and wearing a plastic two-piece ensemble and during the bridge, she performs an organ solo of Johann Sebastian Bach's Toccata and Fugue in D minor. After the end of the song, she creates a monster paw with her dancers and finally the show is over as the curtain goes down.

Critical response

Original show 

The original version of the tour received generally positive reviews  from critics. Jane Stevenson from Toronto Sun gave the concert four out of five stars and said that Lady Gaga came across as a "confident, colourful, and campy performer. [...] Gaga's success was evident with slick-looking videos, lights, elaborate costumes, dancers, and yes, a band, even if her stage was sometimes left dark as she left to make numerous changes." T'Cha Dunlevy for The Gazette noted that the performance was lacking—adding that the show never reached its peak until the end, when Gaga performed the "real rendition" of "Poker Face" and "Bad Romance." "Better late than never", Dunlevy concluded. Aedan Helmer from Jam! magazine said that "At first blush, it might seem the real driving force behind Gaga's meteoric rise to fame is her hand-picked cadre of costume and set designers—dubbed Haus of Gaga—who seemingly know no bounds when it comes to pushing the envelope of haute couture and the theatre of the absurd. [...] But what really sets Gaga apart from the middling masses of lip-synching Britney clones and Idol wannabes is her pure, unadulterated musical talent. [...] The Lady can sing." Theatre critic Kelly Nestruck, while writing for The Guardian, said "While The Monster Ball has nothing on the great operas or the golden age of musical theatre, Lady Gaga's 'electro-pop opera' is at least twice as entertaining and infinitely fresher than any stage musical written over the last decade." Lauren Carter from Boston Herald praised the show saying "[Gaga] only has two albums under her belt but who cares? Every song feels like a hit, and Gaga-as-star is already taking on Madonna-like proportions. [...] After [the show] at the Wang Theater, fans could justifiably walk away thinking Lady Gaga is crazy, brilliant or both." Jeremy Adams from Rolling Stone reviewed the performance at Wang Center in Boston and said that "Throughout the evening, Gaga [..] aimed for a kind of pop theatricality that might potentially cement her burgeoning status as performance artist."

Aidin Vaziri of San Francisco Chronicle said that "During her 90-minute performance—not so much a live concert as a meticulously choreographed spectacle—Lady Gaga also evoked Kanye West with the futuristic set, Britney Spears in her heavy-lidded stage movements, Courtney Love with her interminable between-song monologues highlighted by four-letter squelches and—who else?—Madonna for, oh, just about everything else." Jim Harrington from San Jose Mercury News felt that the show would have been better technically if around thirty minutes were lessened from it. James Montogomery from MTV reviewed the concert at San Diego and said that "[Gaga] powered through and turned the San Diego Sports Arena into a raucous, delightfully raw discotheque." Writing for the Las Vegas Sun, Joe Brown observed that "Lady Gaga out-Cher-ed Cher, made Cirque du Soleil and Britney's 'Circus Tour' look like county fair carnivals, and made New Year's Eve in Las Vegas anticlimactic." Los Angeles Times writer Ann Powers avouched that the tour was "an invigoratingly ambitious show, executed with vigor by its star and her expressive dancers." Jon Pareles from The New York Times said that the tour always provided "something worth a snapshot: a sci-fi tableau, perhaps, or a skimpy, glittery costume. The more her image gets around, the better Lady Gaga does."

Revamped show 

The revamped concerts were also met with critical acclaim. Mark Savage from BBC Online reviewed the first of the revised performances in the United Kingdom. Savage described the concert as a hugely ambitious, terrifyingly loud show, "spread over four acts and held together by a flimsy 'narrative' about Gaga and her dancer friends trying to get to a party." He was also impressed that the entire spectacle was put together in just four weeks. MTV's James Montogomery reviewed the first North American performance of the tour in Montreal, Quebec, Canada. He said that the tour was "packed with more wattage than an overheated power plant and more costume changes than a thousand Vegas reviews, it's the kind of show that leaves you with wide eyes, ringing ears, aching limbs and absolutely zero chance of making it to work in the morning." New York Daily News writer Jim Farber expected that the theatricality of the show might have obscured the songs, but instead felt that Gaga's voice was perfect and the concert actually "pushed Gaga a long way towards her obvious goal – to be the queen of this pop moment." Glenn Gamboa from Newsday said that Gaga "built her monster-sized fame on knowing how to create a spectacle and then having the substance to back it up. For every coat made of Kermit the Frog dolls or headdresses that covered her face in red lace, there was a stomping disco anthem or tender piano ballad to match. That back and forth is the centerpiece of her Monster Ball Tour." Dan Aquilante from the New York Post was critical of the show, calling it "scripted, silly, and tired, right down to Gaga's patter." He added that the 15 costumes Gaga wore during the two-hour plus gig were "more successful helping her cement the notion of an erotic and exotic otherworld." Writing in the Telegram & Gazette, Craig S. Semon was appreciative of the show, calling it "an out-of-this-world blast and end-of-the-world blow-out that must be seen to be believed."

Rick Massimo, reviewing the concert for The Providence Journal, wrote that as a musical theater, the Monster Ball was not that exciting, but "that leaves the music, and when you lay two hours of her songs end-to-end, it's easy to see the vision, the intelligence and a serious songwriting talent at work." Jay N. Miller from The Enterprise was impressed with the show, saying that the music was somewhere between industrial disco and house music with a rock edge, but "always danceable". Philip Borof from Bloomberg Television reviewed the concert in New York's Madison Square Garden and found it average, calling the crowd decked in various costumes as the "most entertaining". Toronto Stars Ben Rayner appreciated the show, exclaiming "hot damn, that was one hell of a show Gaga brought to the Air Canada Centre Sunday night and suddenly it doesn’t seem redundant to add one more voice to the Lady Gaga choir." Mariel Concepción from Billboard felt that Gaga "may be best known for her gaudy outfits and over-the-top stage shows, but at her hometown headlining debut at Madison Square Garden last night, the pop phenomenon proved she's a regular girl at heart." The Seattle Times staff writer Marian Liu declared that as "one of the most anticipated touring acts of the year, [Gaga] stimulated the crowd's senses on Saturday night in a way few artists can. She brought spectacle and backed it up with soul." The Guardian journalist Alexis Petridis reviewed the opening show of the European leg, and commented that "it takes a certain je ne sais quoi to open your show doing something that looks suspiciously like mime on a rickety metal staircase while wearing an outfit with shoulderpads the size of the deck on a small aircraft carrier."

Commercial reception 

As soon as the dates for the show were announced, there was high demand for tickets. As sponsor of the North American Monster Ball Tour, Virgin Mobile customers had access to presale tickets. Bob Stohrer, VP of Marketing for Virgin Mobile USA said "We are excited to take our partnership with Lady Gaga and The Monster Ball Tour to another level. [...] We'll also build on our partnership around combating youth homelessness and continue to enhance the tour experience for fans and our customers." Shows in the first leg of the tour were sold-out completely, prompting Live Nation Inc. to announce that Gaga will return to the U.S. in February 2011 for another run of U.S. dates. The 2011 dates for the North American Monster Ball Tour were announced as starting from February 19 in Atlantic City, with ten arena dates confirmed through April 18. Additional shows were announced, and Semi Precious Weapons collaborated with Gaga until the tour ended. Live Nation Entertainment's global touring division, headed by chairman Arthur Fogel, held the reins as promoter/producer of the Monster Ball tour.

Fogel commented on Gaga's lack of experience in a tour and said that it was an opportunity for her. "As an artist with that kind of talent and vision emerges, it creates a lot of excitement, and ticket sales worldwide demonstrate that people are really excited to see the show. Over the course of the next many months we're trying to play to as many people in as many places as possible", Fogel added. "It's an across the board home run." Demands increased and another additional six dates were added to the announced itinerary. The Monster Ball sold-out shows in Toronto, Vancouver and San Jose who were compelled to add second dates in each city. In Los Angeles, to ensure that concert goers had the best possible access to tickets, a second performance was announced prior to the onsale of the first shows, and both Staples Center concerts were completely sold out. Billboard estimated that by the time the tour wraps up in 2011, it would have grossed close to US$200 million worldwide.

The ticket money from the final performance at Radio City was donated for the Haiti earthquake relief. Gaga announced on the rescheduled show at Elliott Hall of Music on January 26, 2010, that about US$500,000 was collected for the relief. At the 2010 Billboard Touring Awards, Gaga won the Breakthrough Performer Award, as well as the Concert Marketing & Promotion Award, the latter  being an acknowledgement of her partnership with Virgin Mobile. Billboard also placed The Monster Ball Tour at position four on their Year-end Top 25 Tours of 2010. They reported that the tour had grossed US$116 million from 122 shows, with an audience of 1.3 million.  By the end of the year, Pollstar announced that the tour had earned a total of US$133.6 million from 138 shows, making her the only woman to be placed in their list of the Top 10 Tours of 2010.

The top grosser of The Monster Ball Tour were the two concerts at the Bell Centre in Montreal, which collectively earned over US$10 million. By amassing an audience of 111,060 from two shows, the performances at the Foro Sol in Mexico City attained the largest audience of the tour. Gaga's show at the United Center in Chicago became the highest-grossing concert of the third American leg; it earned an estimated US$1.8 million from 15,845 sold seats at a February 28, 2011 performance. The largest crowd, however, came from the Nashville market with 14,925 present at the Bridgestone Arena performance on April 19. The tour continued its presence in the Atlanta market on April 18, 2011, where she performed to 10,864 people at the Arena at Gwinnett Center. The third American leg concluded in Uniondale, New York with a sellout crowd of 13,195 at Nassau Veterans Memorial Coliseum on April 23, 2011. At the conclusion of 2011, The Monster Ball Tour grossed over US$70 million from 45 shows. By May 2011, the tour had grossed a total of US$227.4 million from the 200 reported shows, drawing an audience of 2.5 million, making it the highest-grossing tour in history by a debut headlining artist.

Broadcast and recordings 

HBO filmed a special of The Monster Ball Tour during Gaga's February 21–22, 2011 shows at Madison Square Garden. The special, titled Lady Gaga Presents the Monster Ball Tour: At Madison Square Garden, aired on HBO on May 7, 2011 and Sky1 on May 21, 2011 in the United States and the United Kingdom respectively. Prime showed the special in New Zealand on June 2, 2011. The special showed the whole of the Monster Ball Tour, and some backstage footage, which was shown in black-and-white. It ended with another black-and-white backstage scene where Gaga and her backup singers perform "Born This Way" a capella.

After its broadcast, the special received critical acclaim; critics praised Gaga's performance, but doubted her sincerity during her on-stage rambling and in pre-concert scenes. The special was nominated for five honors at the 63rd Primetime Emmy Awards: Outstanding Variety, Music or Comedy Special; Outstanding Directing for a Variety, Music or Comedy Special; Outstanding Technical Direction, Camerawork, Video Control for a Miniseries, Movie or a Special; Outstanding Picture Editing for a Special (Single or Multi-Camera); and Outstanding Lighting Design/Lighting Direction for a Variety, Music or Comedy Special.

A video album was released for the special and includes extra footage like a capella performances and photo gallery. The 5.1 surround sound of the release utilized DTS-HD Master Audio and new technology to provide the viewer an optimum experience of watching the live concert. Emphasis was given on the main music and the vocals sung during the concert, while adjusting them against the screaming and the cheering of the crowd. The release was a commercial success, reaching the top of the DVD charts in the United States, France and Italy and the top-ten in other nations. It received double platinum certifications in Australia and France, while in the United Kingdom, it was certified gold.

On April 9, 2020, the Lady Gaga media site GagaFrontRow shared a direct screen recording of the Philadelphia show on September 14, 2010. This is the first full version of the concert ever released to the public since the HBO special and subsequent DVD removed many elements of the show, including half of the first song "Dance in the Dark". The full concert is available to watch on YouTube.

Set list 
{{Hidden
| headercss = background: #DCDCDC; font-size: 100%; width: 100%;  
| contentcss = text-align: left; font-size: 100%; width: 100%; 
| header = Original Show
| content =
This set list is representative of the show on November 28, 2009. It does not represent all concerts for the duration of the tour.

"Dance in the Dark"
"Just Dance"
"LoveGame"
"Alejandro"
"Monster"
"So Happy I Could Die"
"Teeth"
"Speechless"
"Poker Face" (piano version)
"Fashion"
"The Fame"
"Money Honey"
"Beautiful, Dirty, Rich"
"Boys Boys Boys"
"Paper Gangsta"
"Poker Face"
"Paparazzi"
Encore
"Eh, Eh (Nothing Else I Can Say)"
"Bad Romance"

}}
{{Hidden
| headercss = background: #DCDCDC; font-size: 100%; width: 100%;  
| contentcss = text-align: left; font-size: 100%; width: 100%; 
| header = Revamped Show
| content =
This set list is representative of the show on August 11, 2010. It does not represent all concerts for the duration of the tour.

"Dance in the Dark"
"Glitter and Grease"
"Just Dance"
"Beautiful, Dirty, Rich"
"Vanity"
"The Fame"
"LoveGame"
"Boys Boys Boys"
"Money Honey"
"Telephone"
"Brown Eyes"
"Speechless"
"You and I"
"So Happy I Could Die"
"Monster"
"Teeth"
"Alejandro"
"Poker Face"
"Paparazzi"
Encore
"Bad Romance" 

}}

Shows

Personnel 

Show Director – Arthur Fogel
Creative Directors – Matthew "Dada" Williams and Willo Perron
Choreographer – Laurie-Ann Gibson, Travis Payne
Assistant Choreographer – Richard Jackson
Stylist – Nicola Formichetti
Stylist Assistant – Anna Trevelyon, Emily Eisen
Hair Stylist – Frederic Aspiras
Make Up Artists – Tara Savelo and Sarah Nicole Tanno
Video Director – Nick Knight and Haus of Gaga
Video Editor – Ruth Hogben, Kevin Stenning (BURSTvisual)
Video Programmer – Matt Shimamoto
Lighting Company – Production Resource Group (PRG)
Live Video – Nocturne Video
Lighting Design – Willie Williams
Lighting Director – Ethan Weber
Management – Troy Carter
Finances – TMI Productions
Legal – Ziffren Brittenham LLP
Promoters – Live Nation Global Touring (Worldwide) and AEG Live (UK)
Tour Sponsors – Virgin Mobile (US) and M.A.C Cosmetics (Worldwide)
Dancers – Michael Silas, Ian McKenzie, Asiel Hardison, Graham Breitenstein, Montana Efaw, Sloan Taylor-Rabinor, Amanda Balen, Molly d'Amour, Mark Kanemura, Jeremy Hudson, Cassidy Noblett, and Victor Rojas

Original shows (2009–10)
Musical Director – Jeff Bhasker
Set Design – Es Devlin
Set Builder – Tait Towers
The Orbit – Nasir Mazhar and Haus of Gaga
Costume Design – Haus of Gaga with Franc Fernandez, Gary Card, Maison Martin Margiela, Miguel Villalobos, Oscar O Lima and Zaldy Goco
Keytar – Lady Gaga
Guitar – Adam Smirnoff
Drums – Charles Haynes
Keyboards – Pete Kuzma
Keyboards/Bass – Mitch Cohn
Revised shows (2010–11)
Musical Director – Joe "Flip" Wilson
Set Design – Roy Bennett
Set Builder – Tait Towers
Set Sculptures – Nick Knight and Kevin Stenning
Costume Design – Haus of Gaga with Giorgio Armani, Miuccia Prada, Philip Treacy, Charlie le Mindu, Jaiden rVa James, Rachel Barrett, Gary Card, Keko Hainswheeler, Atsuko Kudo, Alex Noble, Zaldy Goco, Alun Davies, Marko Mitanovski, Alexander McQueen, and NOKI
Emma and Keytar – Lady Gaga
Guitars – Ricky Tillo and Kareem Devlin
Drums – George "Spanky" McCurdy
Keyboards – Brockett Parsons
Bass – Lanar "Kern" Brantley
Electric Violin – Judy Kang
Harp – Rashida Jolley
Backing vocals – Posh, Charity Davis, Ameera Perkins, Lenesha Randolph, Taneka Samone Duggan, Chevonne Ianuzzi, and Jasmine Morrow

Credits and personnel as per The Monster Ball Tour (original and revised show) booklets.

See also 
 List of highest-grossing concert tours

Notes

References

External links 

 Lady Gaga : News : The Monster Ball Start Interscope Records
 Lady Gaga : News : Film Creations For Monster Ball Interscope Records

2009 concert tours
2010 concert tours
2011 concert tours
Lady Gaga concert tours
Concerts at Malmö Arena
Concert tours of North America
Concert tours of Europe
Concert tours of Oceania
Concert tours of Asia
Concert tours of Canada
Concert tours of the United States
Concert tours of the United Kingdom
Concert tours of Ireland
Concert tours of New Zealand
Concert tours of Australia
Concert tours of Japan
Concert tours of Sweden
Concert tours of Germany
Concert tours of the Netherlands
Concert tours of Belgium
Concert tours of France
Concert tours of Finland
Concert tours of Norway
Concert tours of Denmark
Concert tours of Italy
Concert tours of Austria
Concert tours of Switzerland
Concert tours of Spain
Concert tours of Portugal
Concert tours of Mexico